The 2019 Darwin Tennis International was a professional tennis tournament played on outdoor hard courts. It was the sixth edition of the tournament which was part of the 2019 ITF Women's World Tennis Tour and the 2019 ITF Men's World Tennis Tour. It took place in Darwin, Australia between 23 and 29 September 2019.

Women's singles main-draw entrants

Seeds

 1 Rankings are as of 16 September 2019.

Other entrants
The following players received wildcards into the singles main draw:
  Alison Bai
  Alexandra Bozovic
  Gabriella Da Silva-Fick
  Ivana Popovic

The following players received entry from the qualifying draw:
  Haruna Arakawa
  Jennifer Elie
  Nagi Hanatani
  Magali Kempen
  Amber Marshall
  Alexandra Osborne
  Michika Ozeki
  Wu Ho-ching

Men's singles main-draw entrants

Seeds

 1 Rankings are as of 16 September 2019.

Other entrants
The following players received wildcards into the singles main draw:
  Jai Corbett
  James Ibrahim
  Blake Mott
  Tristan Schoolkate

The following players received entry from the qualifying draw:
  Francis Alcantara
  Jesse Delaney
  Jesse Flores
  Worovin Kumthonkittikul
  Will Maher
  Benard Bruno Nkomba

The following player received entry as a lucky loser:
  Moerani Bouzige
  Jake Delaney

Champions

Women's singles

 Lizette Cabrera def.  Abbie Myers, 6–4, 4–6, 6–2

Men's singles
 Blake Mott def.  Calum Puttergill, 6–1, 6–4

Women's doubles

 Destanee Aiava /  Lizette Cabrera def.  Alison Bai /  Jaimee Fourlis, 6–4, 2–6, [10–3]

Men's doubles
 Dayne Kelly /  Brydan Klein def.  Thomas Fancutt /  Matthew Romios, 7–5, 7–5

References

External links
 2019 Darwin Tennis International (Women) at ITFtennis.com
 2019 Darwin Tennis International (Men) at ITFtennis.com
 Official website

2019 ITF Women's World Tennis Tour
2019 ITF Men's World Tennis Tour
2019 in Australian tennis
September 2019 sports events in Australia
Darwin Tennis International